Janet Achola (born 26 June 1988 in Lira) is a Ugandan middle-distance runner. At the 2012 Summer Olympics, she competed in the Women's 1500 metres.  She also competed at the World Cross Country Championships in 2011 and 2013.

References

External links 
 

1988 births
Living people
Ugandan female middle-distance runners
Olympic athletes of Uganda
Athletes (track and field) at the 2012 Summer Olympics
Athletes (track and field) at the 2010 Commonwealth Games
People from Lira District
Ugandan female cross country runners
Commonwealth Games competitors for Uganda